Sar Asiab (also Romanized as Sar Āsīāb; also known as Darb-e Āsyāb-e Bād) is a village in Emamzadeh Aqaali Abbas Rural District, Emamzadeh District, Natanz County, Isfahan Province, Iran. At the 2006 census, its population was 165, in 48 families.

References 

Populated places in Natanz County